Chamorro may refer to:

 Chamorro people, the indigenous people of the Mariana Islands in the Western Pacific
 Chamorro language, an Austronesian language indigenous to The Marianas
 Chamorro Time Zone, the time zone of Guam and the Northern Mariana Islands
 Chamorro, Las Marías, Puerto Rico, a barrio in Puerto Rico, United States
 Chamorro Party, a 19th-century Portuguese political party; see Portuguese Prime Ministers

People with the surname
 Chamorro (family), a political family of Nicaragua
 Diego Manuel Chamorro (1861–1923)
 Edgar Chamorro (born 1931)
 Emiliano Chamorro Vargas (1871–1966)
 Fernando Chamorro Alfaro (1824–1863)
 Fernando "El Negro" Chamorro (1933–1994)
 Fruto Chamorro (1804–1855)
 Pedro Joaquín Chamorro Alfaro (1818–1890)
 Pedro Joaquín Chamorro Cardenal (1924–1978)
 Rosendo Chamorro
 Violeta Chamorro (born 1929)
 Xavier Chamorro Cardenal (1932–2008)
 Alberto Sansimena Chamorro (born 1985), Spanish footballer
 Aurora Chamorro (1954–2020), Catalan swimmer
 Carlos Pellas Chamorro (born 1953), Nicaraguan businessman
 Charissa Chamorro (born 1977), Chilean-American actress
 Delfín Chamorro (1863–1931), Paraguayan special educator
 Elena Arellano Chamorro (1836–1911), Nicaraguan pedagogue and nun
 Eusebio Chamorro (born 1922), Argentine footballer
 Eustacio Chamorro, Paraguayan footballer
 Francisco Chamorro (born 1981), Argentine cyclist
 Salva Chamorro (born 1990), Spanish footballer
 Sergio Chamorro (born 1971), Nicaraguan footballer

Language and nationality disambiguation pages